Chad Richard Alban (born April 27, 1976) is an American former professional ice hockey player.

Career
Alban started his college career at Michigan State in 1994. He became the starter in his sophomore season and held the job for the next three years. Alban's senior season saw the goaltender post program records in most goaltending categories including goals against average (1.57), save percentage (.926), shutouts (6) and was one win behind Jason Muzzatti for the most in team history. Alban became just the fourth college goaltender to be credited with a goal near the end of the season but he was the first to have actually shot the puck on goal. He led the Spartans to their first conference championship in eight years and allowed only five goals in four games as MSU won the CCHA Tournament. Unfortunately, in the first game of the NCAA Tournament, the team they defeated for the conference crown (Ohio State) won 4–3 in overtime, ending Alban's college career. As of 2020 Alban is still the career leader in wins for the Spartans. He finished as the runner up to Chris Drury for the 1998 Hobey Baker Award, given annually to the best college player.

Alban played minor league hockey for several teams over the next few years and was eventually signed to a contract by the Dallas Stars. While he stayed mostly with the Utah Grizzlies, Alban was called up twice to serve as a backup, riding the bench for three games in the early 2000's. Because he did not play in the games he isn't considered an NHL player. After leaving the Stars organization, he joined the Kalamazoo Wings for three years before heading to Russia and played in the Russian Super League for two seasons. Alban ended his playing career in 2009 after two more years with the Flint Generals.

Career statistics

Regular season and playoffs

Awards and honors

References

External links

1976 births
American ice hockey goaltenders
Houston Aeros (1994–2013) players
Ice hockey players from Michigan
Idaho Steelheads (WCHL) players
Flint Generals players
Grand Rapids Griffins players
HC Neftekhimik Nizhnekamsk players
Living people
Michigan State Spartans men's ice hockey players
Mobile Mysticks players
Sportspeople from Kalamazoo, Michigan
Traktor Chelyabinsk players
Utah Grizzlies (IHL) players
AHCA Division I men's ice hockey All-Americans